Yenice (or Nunib) is a village in the Gercüş District of Batman Province in Turkey. The village is populated by Arabs and had a population of 185 in 2021.

References 

Villages in Gercüş District
Arab settlements in Batman Province